is the 12th single by Japanese idol girl group NMB48. The main track is centered by Ririka Sutou. It was released on July 15, 2015. It was number-one on the Oricon Weekly Singles Chart with 371,276 copies sold. It was the seventeenth best-selling single of 2015 in Japan according to the Oricon Yearly Singles Chart, with 449,148 copies sold. As of December 7, 2015 it had sold 449,148 copies. It also reached the second place on the Billboard Japan Hot 100.

Track listing

Type-A

Type-B

Type-C

Charts

Year-end charts

References

2015 singles
2015 songs
Japanese-language songs
NMB48 songs
Oricon Weekly number-one singles
Song articles with missing songwriters